Elkins Field  is a privately owned, public use airport in Bladen County, North Carolina, United States. It is located three nautical miles (6 km) east of the central business district of Clarkton, North Carolina.

Facilities and aircraft 
Elkins Field has one runway designated 1/19 with a turf surface measuring 2,000 by 75 feet (610 x 23 m).

For the 12-month period ending September 21, 2007, the airport had 300 general aviation aircraft operations, an average of 25 per month. At that time there were one single-engine aircraft based at this airport.

See also 
 List of airports in North Carolina

References

External links 
 Aerial image as of March 1998 from USGS The National Map
 Airport information for 1E6 at AirNav
 Aeronautical chart at SkyVector

Airports in North Carolina
Transportation in Bladen County, North Carolina
Buildings and structures in Bladen County, North Carolina